The Tower of Vignale was a Genoese tower located in the commune of Ghisonaccia on the east coast of the  Corsica. No trace of the tower survives.

The tower was one of a series of coastal defences constructed by the Republic of Genoa between 1530 and 1620 to stem the attacks by Barbary pirates.

See also
List of Genoese towers in Corsica

Notes and references

Towers in Corsica